Edmund Darrell (by 1492 – 1536/40) was an English politician.

He was a Member (MP) of the Parliament of England for Marlborough in 1529.

References

15th-century births
1536 deaths
English MPs 1529–1536